Violence against Palestinians in Iraq was a series of attacks, persecution, eviction, expulsion, harassment, rape, and killings of Palestinians in Iraq after the Fall of Saddam.

Background
A sizable amount of Palestinians came to Iraq after the Nakba. Before 2003, there were about 35,000 Palestinians in Iraq, mainly concentrated in the large cities. After the 2003 Iraq War, the population is between 5,000 and 15,000, although it's difficult to get the exact number.

After the Iraq War
Things quickly went downhill for Palestinians after the Iraq War. Since then, they have been the target of attacks, persecution, eviction, expulsion, harassment, rape, and killings by Shia militants, and the new Iraqi Government with militant groups particularly targeting them for their support for Saddam Hussein and that they were treated better than Shias under Saddam's Rule. After the fall of Saddam Hussein in 2003, Palestinians in Iraq were subject to discrimination, violence and mass killings by the new Iraqi government and many militias. al-Hurriyya, al-Doura and al-Baladiyyat in Baghdad were Palestinian neighborhoods that were also raided and attacked. UNHCR in 2007 provided details of violence and persecution against Palestinians in Iraq, that included abductions, attacks, torture by militias and the Iraqi Ministry of the Interior and the deaths of many Palestinian women, men and children. After Al-Askari Mosque was bombed, Palestinians in Iraq were immediately blamed for the attack and became targets. According to Human Rights Watch, in March, a militia known as the "Judgment Day Brigades" passed around leaflets in Palestinian neighborhoods, accusing Palestinians of working with terrorists and said the following: "We warn that we will eliminate you all if you do not leave this area for good within ten days." Ali al-Sistani issued a fatwa demanding killings of Palestinians to stop. However, violence continued and the mass killings and death threats put the Palestinians in fear and forced thousands to flee Iraq, stated by the United Nations High Commissioner for Refugees.

Leaving Iraq
Most Palestinians in Iraq were killed or left for Syria and Jordan (None of which are signatory to the 1951 Geneva Convention, although they adhere to the 1965 Casablanca Protocol without reservation.) Despite all the generosity and hospitality of Syria and Jordan to Iraqis, and their population of Palestinian refugees, both countries only accepted a few Palestinians coming from Iraq. After that, many have been left in filthy conditions in border camps such as Al-Waleed or Al-Karama, both of them are in “No Man’s Land” near the near the Jordan-Syria border.

References

Iraq–State of Palestine relations
Anti-Palestinian sentiment in the Middle East
Religiously motivated violence in Iraq